Yengi Orkh or Yengi Arkh or Yengi Erkh or Yangi Arakh may refer to:
 Yengi Arkh, Bijar, Kurdistan Province
 Yangi Arakh, Divandarreh, Kurdistan Province
 Yengi Orkh, West Azerbaijan